Savage Dreams is the debut studio album by the American rapper Baby Beesh, released on June 19, 2001, on Dope House Records. It was produced by B.R., Happy Perez, Hotan, Mario Ayala and Pain. The album shows a mixture of West Coast style with a southern flow in beats. It has guest performances by SPM, Frost, Jay Tee, Mr. Kee, Don Cisco and Merciless.

The song "Styrofoam Cup" originally appeared on the South Park Mexican compilation album, The Purity Album.

Track listing

External links 
 Savage Dreams at MusicBrainz
 Savage Dreams at Tower Records

Baby Bash albums
2001 debut albums
Albums produced by Happy Perez
West Coast hip hop albums